Lin Yen-hung (born 5 March 1958) is a Taiwanese para table tennis player. He won a silver medal at the 2000 Summer Paralympics, and another silver at the 2016 Summer Paralympics at age 58.

He contracted polio when he was a child. He began playing table tennis in 1975.

References 
 

1958 births 
Living people 
Paralympic medalists in table tennis
Table tennis players at the 2016 Summer Paralympics 
Table tennis players at the 2000 Summer Paralympics 
Table tennis players at the 2004 Summer Paralympics 
Table tennis players at the 2008 Summer Paralympics 
Table tennis players at the 2012 Summer Paralympics 
Medalists at the 2000 Summer Paralympics 
Medalists at the 2016 Summer Paralympics 
People from Yunlin County
Taiwanese male table tennis players 
Paralympic silver medalists for Chinese Taipei 
Paralympic table tennis players of Chinese Taipei 
People with polio
FESPIC Games competitors
21st-century Taiwanese people